The Soul Collector (also known as 8: A South African Horror Story or simply 8) is a 2019 South African supernatural thriller film written by Johannes Ferdinand Van Zyl and Harold Holscher, who is also the director. The film stars Garth Breyetenbach, Inge Beckmann, Keita Luna and Tshamano Sebe.

Plot
Finding himself bankrupt, William Ziel is forced to return to the farm he inherited from his father to start a new life with his fragmented family.

Cast
 Garth Breyetenbach as William Ziel
 Inge Beckmann as Sarah
 Keita Luna as Mary
 Tshamano Sebe as Lazarus

Release
The film had its world premiere at the 2019 Fantasia Film Festival on 20 July 2019.

Since 19 June 2020, the film is available on Netflix. It is also available on Shudder.

References

External links
 
 
 
 
 

2019 films
2019 horror thriller films
South African horror thriller films
2010s English-language films
English-language South African films